Jurica Vrucina (born 31 October 1989 in Croatia) is a Croatian footballer who plays for NK Međimurec Dunjkovec-Pretetinec.

Career
Vrucina started his senior career with NK Slaven Belupo. In 2012, he signed for Albanian Superliga club FK Tomori Berat, where he made four appearances and scored zero goals. After that, he played for Croatian clubs NK Međimurje and NK Nedelišće and Austrian clubs SC Kemeten, SVH Waldbach, Mönichkirchen, SV Mühldorf, and Union Großsteinbach.

References

External links
 
 Vrucina: Shkëlqej te Tomori dhe kap një klub të madh 
 Vruçina shënon, por nuk bind ende stafin teknik 
 Vuçiç dhe Vrucina, Kastrioti ka 2 të huaj pa firmë 
 Tomori humbet Vrucinën, gjashtë muaj jashtë fushave 
 Tomori i shpëton dënimit, paguan kroatin Vrucina
 Nuk pagoi kroatin, FIFA i heq tri pik Tomorit
 
 Jurica Vrucina mit Triplepack - Mönichkirchen bezwingt Neunkirchen 
 meinfussball.at Tag 
 Statistike hrvatskog nogometa Profile

1989 births
Living people
Sportspeople from Varaždin
Association football forwards
Association football defenders
Croatian footballers
NK Slaven Belupo players
NK Međimurje players
NK Rudeš players
NK Ivančica players
FK Tomori Berat players
Kategoria Superiore players
Austrian 2. Landesliga players
Croatian expatriate footballers
Expatriate footballers in Albania
Croatian expatriate sportspeople in Albania
Expatriate footballers in Austria
Croatian expatriate sportspeople in Austria